Justine McEleney (born 15 May 1994) is a British beauty pageant titleholder who was crowned as Miss Earth Northern Ireland 2014 that gives her the right to represent Northern Ireland at Miss Earth 2014 in November. She was crowned by Miss Earth Northern Ireland 2013, Amira Graham.

Pageantry

Miss Earth Northern Ireland 2014
Justine joined Miss Earth Northern Ireland 2014. She won the pageant and succeeded Amira Graham. Her elemental court includes Nicole Caldwell as Miss Air, Catherine McCormack as Miss Water and Catriona McAllister as Miss Fire.

Miss Earth 2014
By winning Miss Earth Northern Ireland, Justine flew to the Philippines in November to compete with almost 100 other candidates to be Alyz Henrich's successor as Miss Earth.

References

1994 births
Living people
Miss Earth 2014 contestants
British beauty pageant winners